Ronald Reagan High School is a public high school located in the North East Independent School District in San Antonio, Texas, United States, and named after U.S. President Ronald Reagan. The school serves a portion of Timberwood Park.

In 2013 Reagan was ranked fifth on Children at Risk's ranking of the top 10 high schools in Greater San Antonio.

History
San Antonio, like many Sun Belt cities, experienced explosive growth in its suburbs beginning in the early 1990s. This growth was particularly evident in affluent areas formed by people moving to the city. In Stone Oak and Sonterra north of Route 1604 and between the Blanco Road and US-281 corridors, this rapid growth caused severe overcrowding at nearby Winston Churchill High School. At the time Churchill was the farthest-north school in the North East Independent School District, and its student population grew to 3,400 at a school designed for not more than 2,500. The district recognized this problem, and included an allocation to build a new high school in the area as a part of its 1997 bond issue. The property for the school was purchased  from descendants of rancher William Classen prior to passage of the bond issue.

After voters approved the bond issue, construction began on the  campus. Spaw Glass was the general contractor for the project. The name "Ronald Reagan" was chosen by future students of the school (those currently in attendance at other North East schools) from a list selected by the district's Board of Trustees. A spirit committee selected the mascot "Rattlers" from three finalists and chose green, silver, and black as the school colors.

As construction nearing the end, problems with the tiling in some classrooms led to the discovery of a previously unknown spring under the foundation of the building. This caused cracks and potentially long-lasting damage to the brand new school. Despite this, Reagan opened to much fanfare in August 1999, although constructions issues related to the underground spring prevented use of some classroom facilities well into the school's first year.

The opening of Lady Bird Johnson High School in 2008 relieved overcrowding at Reagan as San Antonio's population continued booming in the early part of the 2000s.

Band

The Ronald Reagan High School Marching Band has been in existence since the school was opened. With the exception of the 2009 BOA Arlington regional, the band has been placed in the finals at every regional entered since the school's beginning. Not only does the Ronald Reagan Marching Band compete in the Texas University Interscholastic League marching competition held every other year, it also enters annually in various Bands of America events including the regionals in Arlington, Texas, and Houston, Texas, the Super Regional in San Antonio, as well as the Grand National BOA competition held in Indianapolis, Indiana. The band placed second in 2003 and 2005, eleventh in 2002 and 2012, seventh in 2016, and ninth in 2021. The band also participated in nationals in 2007, making semi-finals but missing finals. In 2006, Reagan tied for third in the state of Texas at the UIL State Marching Contest Finals. In 2012, Reagan placed third at the UIL State Marching Contest Prelims, and in 2014 the band placed 5th in the state. In 2018, the band placed second at BOA Super Regional San Antonio. In 2019 the band had been selected to march in the 2018 Rose Parade in Pasadena, California and the 2019 Macy's Thanksgiving Day Parade in New York City. In 2019, the band was crowned the BOA San Antonio Super Regional Champion with "Secret World”. Their finals performance achieved the highest BOA Super Regional score of all time, with a 97.3.

Past shows
Grand Nationals performances are denoted with an asterisk.

 Perpetual Motion 2000
 Out of the Box 2001
 The Journey Within 2002*
 Beyond Perimeters 2003*
 Synergy 2004
 You Never Know 2005*
 Transitions 2006
 It Chooses Me 2007*
 En Garde 2008
 Have You Got It In You? 2009
 RE- 2010
 Spaces 2011
 Let It Shine 2012*
 Epinicion 2013
 Through The Hourglass 2014
 Every(ONE) 2015 
 One Love 2016*
 Us & Them 2017
 Loop 2018
 Secret World 2019
 Iconic 2020 (non-competitive season due to the COVID-19 Pandemic)
 The Path 2021*
In Plain Sight 2022

Athletics
The Reagan Rattlers compete in these sports - 

Baseball
Basketball
Cross Country
Football
Golf
Soccer
Softball
Swimming and Diving
Tennis
Track and Field
Volleyball
Wrestling
Lacrosse
Dance

Notable alumni
 Alexander Hernandez — professional UFC fighter
 Trevor Knight (Class of 2012) — former NFL quarterback, former quarterback at Texas A&M and the University of Oklahoma 
 Jeff Manship (Class of 2003) — MLB pitcher, currently a free agent
 Anthony Vasquez (Class of 2005) — professional baseball player
 Ty Summers (Class of 2014) — current NFL linebacker for the New Orleans Saints
 Kellen Mond — NFL quarterback for the Cleveland Browns, former quarterback for the Texas A&M Aggies

References

North East Independent School District high schools
Educational institutions established in 1999
High schools in San Antonio
1999 establishments in Texas